HD 73267 b is an extrasolar planet located approximately 164 light-years away. This planet was discovered on October 26, 2008 by Moutou et al. using the HARPS spectrograph on ESO's 3.6 meter telescope installed at La Silla Observatory in Atacama desert, Chile. In 2022, the inclination and true mass of HD 73267 b were measured via astrometry.

See also 

 BD-17°63 b
 HD 131664
 HD 143361 b
 HD 145377 b
 HD 153950 b
 HD 20868 b
 HD 43848
 HD 48265 b
 HD 73256 b

References

External links 
 

Exoplanets discovered in 2008
Giant planets
Pyxis (constellation)
Exoplanets detected by radial velocity
Exoplanets detected by astrometry